Capitol University is a non-sectarian, co-educational private university located in Cagayan de Oro, Philippines. It is registered with the Securities and Exchange Commission as a stock corporation and operates with the authority of the Department of Education for its primary and secondary programs and the Commission on Higher Education for its tertiary, graduate and postgraduate programs.

History

1971–1979
Upon its opening in 1971, the university offered secondary course and tertiary courses in Liberal Arts, Commerce, Education and Secretarial. In 1973, the first Midwifery program in Region 10 began with the inauguration of a Cagayan Capitol College Maternity Hospital and then later to Capitol University Medical Center which eventually transferred to Gusa, Cagayan de Oro on 1984. The following year, 1974, the Nautical and Marine Engineering Programs were opened along with Civil Engineering and Forestry. In 1976, Mechanical Engineering, Nursing and Agriculture programs were opened. The same year, the school acquired the M/V Capitol College, a 650-ton freighter which served as the training ship for the Maritime cadets.

1980–1989
In 1981, the graduate school was opened with a Masters in Filipino as the initial program offering. Presently, the Capitol University Graduate School offers two doctoral programs and five Master's Programs. In 1987, the preschool and elementary teachers' training departments were transferred to a campus in Gusa, Cagayan de Oro and named the St. Francis Learning Center, after St. Francis of Assisi.

1990–present
During the 1990s, Cagayan Capitol College opened more tertiary programs like Physical Therapy, Criminology and Computer Science, Cisco Networking Program, the Expanded Tertiary Education Equivalency and Accreditation Program (ETEEAP) and Associate programs. The in-house review for the Nursing Licensure, Commission on Graduates of Foreign Nursing Schools (CGFNS), NCLEX and Criminology Board exams were opened.

To promote a culture of research and service to the community, Capitol University formed the Capitol University Research and Extension Office (CURExO).

On February 3, 2003, 32 years after its founding, Cagayan Capitol College received its charter as a university. On May 2, 2003, it was formally inaugurated as Capitol University with Atty. Casimiro B. Juarez, Jr. installed as the first university president.

Schools and colleges

Undergraduate

College of Computer Studies
The College of Computer Studies is the newest on the campus. The College of Computer studies is a CHED Center of Development, making it one of the most computing-intensive colleges in the city. With a computer-to-student ratio of 1 to 1, students have access to more than 200 on-campus computers ranging from current model PCs to high-end graphics workstations.

Courses offered:
Bachelor of Science in Information Technology
Associate in Computer Technology

College of Education
The College of Education offers a program for Elementary Education and Secondary Education. Both programs consist of three years of academic instruction and one year of practical teaching in Capitol University Basic Education Department or CU-BED (formerly St. Francis Learning Center).

Courses offered:
Bachelor of Elementary Education
Bachelor of Secondary Education, majors in English, Math, Physical Education, Social Studies

College of Engineering
The College of Engineering is recognized by CHED as a "Center of Development" and its BSCE and BSME programs are Level III accredited with the Philippine Association of Colleges and Universities - Commission in Accreditation (PACU-COA).

Courses offered:
Bachelor of Science in Civil Engineering
Bachelor of Science in Electronics Engineering
Bachelor of Science in Mechanical Engineering

College of Maritime Education
The College of Maritime Education (CU-CME) is composed of the Nautical Studies Department and the Marine Engineering Department. The college is under a Superintendent and Dean of each department. It has a Shipboard Training Office which facilitates the shipboard affairs of its graduates.

The school complies with the IMO-STCW as well with CHED requirements. CU-MEP is accredited by the Det Norske Veritas (DNV) and is one of the first schools in the Philippines that obtained ISO 9000 certification. CU-MEP is accredited with the Philippine Association of Colleges and University Commission in Accreditation (PACUCOA).

Courses offered:
Bachelor of Science in Marine Transportation
Bachelor of Science in Marine Engineering

College of Nursing
Courses offered:
Bachelor of Science in Nursing

The CU College of Nursing provides its classroom instruction by faculty and a Nursing Skills Laboratory to develop competencies in performing nursing procedures. The Capitol University Medical Center, a 300-bed tertiary hospital, serves as the base training hospital for the College of Nursing and Midwifery students.

School of Midwifery
 Courses offered:
Graduate in Midwifery

Graduate school
Doctor of Philosophy in Educational Management
Doctor of Management
Master of Arts in Educational Administration
Master of Arts in Filipino
Master of Arts in Guidance and Counseling
Master of Business Management
Master of Education in English
Master of Public Service Management

See also
 Capitol University Medical Center

References

External links
Capitol University website
Capitol University Medical Center website

Universities and colleges in Cagayan de Oro
Educational institutions established in 1971